SJK (C) Pin Hwa 2 (Chinese: 滨华国民型华文小学(二)校) is a Chinese-type national primary school in Klang, Selangor, West Malaysia.

History 
SJK(C) Pin Hwa was first founded in the summer of 1923 as a night school called Wah Khiu Night School. The school was originally located in a shoplot in the south of Klang, but moved in 1926 to another shoplot near Jalan Meru in northern Klang. Now consisting of both morning and night classes, it was renamed to Wah Khiu School. In 1940, the school moved into the newly completed “E-shaped” school building at Jalan Goh Hock Huat, and the number of students increased to more than 1,200. In 1947, the school added lower secondary classes, and it was renamed to Wah Khiu Middle & Primary School.

In 1958, the primary school became the Wah Khiu Standard-type Chinese Primary School. By 1962, the school was renamed to SJK(C) Pin Hwa, and started to follow the government syllabus with the teachers under the Ministry of Education payroll. In the same year, the primary and secondary school split into two entities, Pin Hwa Independent High School and SJK(C) Pin Hwa, with the primary school having a student population of 2,100.

In 1974, SJK(C) Pin Hwa was split once again due to student overpopulation, this time into SJK(C) Pin Hwa 1 and SJK(C) Pin Hwa 2. Due to lack of classrooms, there were more classes in Pin Hwa 1, which had a total of 1,656 students, all of which would attend the afternoon session until the end of 1987. In 1988, the Ministry of Education introduced the new KBSR syllabus, while SJK(C) Pin Hwa 1 & 2 improved their facilities, allowing for the two schools to rotate between morning and afternoon sessions for classes.

In 1980, a three-storey school building was built, and construction was finally completed at the end of 1981. Datuk Lew Sip Hon, the former Deputy Minister of Trade and Industry, was invited to host the opening ceremony of the new building.

The rapid development of Pin Hwa Independent High School prompted the demolition of eight old classrooms which the primary school had been borrowing at the time, and it urgently needed to build a new four-storey school building to cope. With the support of its alumni and the local community, the new school building was finally completed in mid-1989. On the eve of the school's 66th anniversary, the former Menteri Besar of Selangor, Tan Sri Mohamed Taib, presided over the opening ceremony.

New housing areas being built in the suburban areas and new families living further away from the city centre led to SJKC Pin Hwa 2, along with its sister school SJKC Pin Hwa 1, relocating in 2001. Pin Hwa 1 moved to a plot of land in Setia Alam, Shah Alam in year 2007, while Pin Hwa 2 moved to Aman Perdana, Klang, Selangor at the end of 2008 and has been operating there since 5 January 2009.

The school started with 13 classrooms and 375 students and 28 teachers in 2009.

School Compound 
School facilities include the following:
 Basketball Court
 Multipurpose Field
 School Hall
 Canteen
 Dataran Pin Hwa 2 (Pin Hwa 2 Square)
 Classrooms (Block A & B)
 Computer Rooms
 Toilets
 Teacher's Office

References

External links 
 School Website: http://www.pinhwa2.edu.my

Schools in Selangor
Chinese-language schools in Malaysia
Primary schools in Malaysia
Educational institutions established in 1923
1923 establishments in British Malaya